Joyce Magalhães Borini (born 22 March 1988) is a Brazilian professional footballer who plays as a centre back for Italian Serie A club FC Como Women and the Brazil women's national team. She previously played for Spanish Primera División club Madrid CFF.

Borini first played in Primera with Rayo Vallecano in the 2013–14 season, and subsequently moved to Sporting Huelva and Valencia CF before signing for Granadilla in 2018. In November 2017 she first played for the Brazilian national team in a friendly against Chile.

Titles
 Copa de la Reina (1): 2015

References

External links
Profile at Txapeldunak.com 

1988 births
Living people
Brazilian women's footballers
Brazil women's international footballers
Brazilian expatriate women's footballers
Brazilian expatriate sportspeople in Spain
Expatriate women's footballers in Spain
Primera División (women) players
Valencia CF Femenino players
Women's association football midfielders
AD Torrejón CF Femenino players
Rayo Vallecano Femenino players
Sporting de Huelva players
UD Granadilla Tenerife players
Madrid CFF players
A.S. Roma (women) players
Brazilian expatriate sportspeople in Italy
Expatriate women's footballers in Italy
S.S.D. F.C. Como Women players
Serie A (women's football) players